The Qiongzhou Strait, also called the  is the Chinese strait that separates Guangdong's Leizhou Peninsula from the island province of Hainan. It connects the Gulf of Tonkin on its west to the South China Sea on its east. The strait is susceptible to closure during strong typhoon activity.

Whales and dugongs were once common in the strait.

History

The strait was crossed by the People's Liberation Army forces in the spring of 1950.

Transportation
The Guangdong–Hainan Ferry (part of the Guangdong–Hainan railway) carries rail cars and automotive vehicles across the strait.

While a bridge was planned in the early 2000s, it never came to fruition. A bridge or tunnel has been discussed, as of 2018, as travel by air or ferry can leave residents and visitors isolated when bad weather sets in.

See also
 Haikou, formerly called Qiongzhou

References

Further reading
 Shi et al., The Role of Qiongzhou Strait in the Seasonal Variation of the South China Sea Circulation

External links
 

Straits of China
Straits of the South China Sea
Bodies of water of Guangdong
Bodies of water of Hainan
Gulf of Tonkin
South China